William II (anglicized as William Frederick George Louis; 6 December 1792 – 17 March 1849) was King of the Netherlands, Grand Duke of Luxembourg, and Duke of Limburg.

William II was the son of William I and Wilhelmine of Prussia. When his father, who up to that time ruled as sovereign prince, proclaimed himself king in 1815, he became Prince of Orange as heir apparent of the Kingdom of the Netherlands. With the abdication of his father on 7 October 1840, William II became king. During his reign, the Netherlands became a parliamentary democracy with the new constitution of 1848.

William II was married to Anna Pavlovna of Russia. They had four sons and one daughter. William II died on 17 March 1849 and was succeeded by his son William III.

Early life and education 
Willem Frederik George Lodewijk was born on 6 December 1792 in The Hague. He was the eldest son of King William I of the Netherlands and Wilhelmine of Prussia. His maternal grandparents were King Frederick William II of Prussia and his second wife Frederika Louisa of Hesse-Darmstadt.

When William was two, he and his family fled to England after allied British-Hanoverian troops left the Republic and entering French troops defeated the army of the United Provinces, claiming liberation by joining the anti-Orangist Patriots. William spent his youth in Berlin at the Prussian court, where he followed a military education and served in the Prussian Army. After this, he studied civil law at Christ Church, University of Oxford.

Military service 

He entered the British Army, and in 1811, as a 19-year-old aide-de-camp in the headquarters of Arthur Wellesley, 1st Duke of Wellington, was allowed to observe several of Wellington's campaigns of the Peninsular War. Though not yet 20, the young prince, according to the customs of the time, was made lieutenant colonel on 11 June 1811 and colonel on 21 October that year. On 8 September 1812 he was made an aide-de-camp to the Prince Regent and on 14 December 1813 promoted to major-general. His courage and good nature made him very popular with the British, who nicknamed him "Slender Billy". He returned to the Netherlands in 1813 when his father became sovereign prince, and in May 1814 succeeded Sir Thomas Graham as the highest-ranking officer of the British forces stationed there.

On 8 July 1814, he was promoted to lieutenant-general in the British Army, and on 25 July to general. As such, he was senior officer of the Allied army in the Low Countries when Napoleon I of France escaped from Elba in 1815. He relinquished command on the arrival of the Duke of Wellington, and, though this was his first real battle, served as commander of the I Allied Corps, first at the Battle of Quatre Bras (16 June 1815) and then at the Battle of Waterloo (18 June 1815), where he was wounded in his left shoulder by a musket ball. He was aged 22. As a sign of gratitude for what the Dutch throne styled "his" victory at Waterloo, William was offered Soestdijk Palace by the Dutch people.

Military historian William Siborne blamed many casualties suffered by Coalition forces during the Waterloo Campaign to William's inexperience. In response, Siborne was accused by Lieutenant-General Willem Jan Knoop of misrepresenting William's actions at Waterloo. An inspection into the archives of Siborne by Dutch officer Francois de Bas in 1897 claimed to discover the "selective use of sources" and "numerous miscounts and untruths".

Marriage 

In 1814, William was briefly engaged to Princess Charlotte of Wales, only child of the Prince Regent (later George IV of the United Kingdom) and his estranged wife, Caroline of Brunswick. The engagement was arranged by the Prince Regent, but it was broken off because Charlotte's mother was against the marriage and because Charlotte did not want to move to the Netherlands. On 21 February 1816 at the Chapel of the Winter Palace in St. Petersburg, William married Grand Duchess Anna Pavlovna of Russia, youngest sister to Czar Alexander I of Russia, who arranged the marriage to seal the good relations between Imperial Russia and the Netherlands. On 17 February 1817 in Brussels, his first son, Willem Alexander, the future King William III, was born.

Already in 1819, he was blackmailed over what Minister of Justice Van Maanen termed in a letter his "shameful and unnatural lusts": presumably bisexuality. Separately, his signing the constitutional reform of 1848, enabling a parliamentary democracy, may have been partly influenced by blackmail. He may also have had a relationship with a dandy by the name of Pereira.

Belgian Revolution 

William II enjoyed considerable popularity in what is now Belgium (then the Southern Netherlands), as well as in parts of the rest of the Netherlands for his affability and moderation, and in 1830, on the outbreak of the Belgian revolution, he did his utmost in Brussels as a peace broker, to bring about a settlement based on administrative autonomy for the southern provinces, under the House of Orange-Nassau. His father then rejected the terms of accommodation that the son had proposed without further consultation; afterwards, relations with his father were once again tense.

In April 1831, William II was sent by his father to be the military leader during the Ten Days' Campaign in order to recover what would become Belgium. Although initially successful, the Dutch withdrew after French intervention on the side of the rebels. European mediation established Leopold of Saxe-Coburg-Gotha (widower of William's former fiancée, Charlotte) on the throne of a new monarchy. Peace was finally established in 1839 when Belgium was recognized by the Netherlands.

Reign 

On 7 October 1840, on his father's abdication, he acceded to the throne as William II. Although he shared his father's conservative inclinations, he did not intervene in governmental affairs nearly as much as his father had. There was increased agitation for broad constitutional reform and a wider electoral franchise. Although William was certainly no democrat, he acted with sense and moderation.

The Revolutions of 1848 broke out all over Europe. In Paris the Bourbon-Orléans monarchy that had stolen "his" southern provinces fell. Warned that the revolution might spread to the Netherlands next, William decided to institute a more liberal regime, believing it was better to grant reforms instead of having them imposed on him on less favourable terms later. As he later put it, "I changed from conservative to liberal in one night". He chose a committee headed by the prominent liberal Johan Rudolf Thorbecke to create a new constitution.

The new document provided that the Eerste Kamer (Senate), previously appointed by the King, would be elected indirectly by the Provincial States.  The Tweede Kamer (House of Representatives), previously elected by the Provincial States, would be elected directly via census suffrage in electoral districts, with the franchise limited to those who paid a certain amount in taxes. Ministers were now fully responsible to the Tweede Kamer. For all intents and purposes, the real power passed to the Tweede Kamer, and the king was now a servant of government rather than its master. That constitution of 1848, amended numerous times (most notably by the replacement of census suffrage by universal manhood suffrage and districts with nationwide party-list proportional representation, both in 1917) is still in effect today.

He swore in his first and only cabinet under the terms of the new constitution a few months before his sudden death in Tilburg, North Brabant (1849).

In fiction 
He is a recurring character in the historical novels of Georgette Heyer, most notably in An Infamous Army.

William appears as a character in the historical fiction novel Sharpe's Waterloo by Bernard Cornwell, and its television adaptation, in which he is portrayed by Paul Bettany.

Honours 

 : Grand Cross of the Military William Order, 8 July 1815
 : Founder of the Order of the Oak Crown, 29 December 1841
 :
 Knight of the House Order of Fidelity, 1841
 Grand Cross of the Order of the Zähringer Lion, 1841
 :
 Knight of the Order of St. George, 1840
 Grand Cross of the Royal Guelphic Order
  Kingdom of Prussia: Knight of the Order of the Black Eagle, 17 December 1808
 :
 Knight of the Order of St. Andrew, 22 June 1814
 Knight of the Order of St. Alexander Nevsky, 22 June 1814
 Knight of the Order of St. George, 2nd Class, 8 July 1815
 : Commander of the Military Order of Maria Theresa
 : Grand Cross of the Order of the White Falcon, 24 June 1838
 : Knight of the Order of the Golden Fleece, 18 September 1814
 : Grand Cross of the Military Merit Order, 1819

Relationships 
William II had a string of relationships with both men and women which led him to be blackmailed. The homosexual relationships that William II had as crown prince and as king were reported by journalist . The king surrounded himself with male servants whom he could not dismiss because of his 'abominable motive' for hiring them in the first place. One of his closest friends was the Wallonian aristocrat Albéric du Chastel. William II was blackmailed for the first time for his intimacies with men in 1818. After the Dutch secret polices captured the blackmailers they were sent to the Dutch colonies across the sea.

Issue 

William II and queen Anna Pavlovna had five children:
 William Alexander Paul Frederick Louis (1817–1890), William III, King of the Netherlands (1849 to 1890).
 William Alexander Frederick Constantine Nicolas Michael (1818–1848). Nicknamed Sascha. Never married.
 William Frederick Henry "the Navigator" (1820–1879). Married firstly Princess Amalia of Saxe-Weimar-Eisenach and secondly Princess Marie of Prussia, but had no issue.
 Prince William Alexander Ernst Frederick Casimir (1822), died in infancy
 Wilhelmina Marie Sophie Louise (1824–1897). Married Karl Alexander, Grand Duke of Saxe-Weimar-Eisenach, and had issue.

Ancestry

See also 

 Orange, New South Wales, Australian city named for William II by Thomas Mitchell
 Place Guillaume II, a square in Luxembourg City
 Willem II (football club), a Dutch football club from Tilburg named after the King.

References

External links 
 
 

1792 births
1849 deaths
Bisexual men
British Army commanders of the Napoleonic Wars
British field marshals
Alumni of Christ Church, Oxford
19th-century monarchs in Europe
Burials in the Royal Crypt at Nieuwe Kerk, Delft
Deaths from pneumonia in the Netherlands
Dukes of Limburg
Dutch military commanders of the Napoleonic Wars
Dutch monarchs
Dutch members of the Dutch Reformed Church
Grand Dukes of Luxembourg
Knights Grand Cross of the Order of the Bath
House of Orange-Nassau
Bisexual military personnel
LGBT heads of state
LGBT heads of government
LGBT royalty
Vice-presidents of the Council of State (Netherlands)
Knights Grand Cross of the Military Order of William
Knights of the Golden Fleece of Spain
Members of the Council of State (Netherlands)
Nobility from The Hague
People of the Belgian Revolution
Princes of Orange
Princes of Orange-Nassau
Protestant monarchs
Prussian Army personnel of the Napoleonic Wars
Recipients of the Order of St. George of the Second Degree
Recipients of the Waterloo Medal
Commanders Cross of the Military Order of Maria Theresa
Recipients of the Army Gold Cross